Tomassoni is an Italian surname. Notable people with the surname include:

David Tomassoni (1952-2022), American politician
Mirko Tomassoni (born 1969), Captain Regent of San Marino
Ronn Tomassoni (born 1958), American ice hockey player and coach
Thomas Tomassoni (1616–1654), Italian Roman Catholic bishop

See also
Tomassoni awards, an Italian physics award

Italian-language surnames
Patronymic surnames
Surnames from given names